Surviving the Game is a 1994 American action-adventure film directed by Ernest R. Dickerson. It is loosely based on the 1924 short story "The Most Dangerous Game" by Richard Connell. The film stars Ice-T, Rutger Hauer, Charles S. Dutton, John C. McGinley, William McNamara, Gary Busey, and F. Murray Abraham.

Surviving the Game was released in the United States on April 15, 1994, by New Line Cinema. The film received negative reviews from critics and was a box office bomb, grossing $7.7 million against a production budget of $7.4 million (not including advertisement and distribution costs).

Plot
Jack Mason is a homeless man from Seattle, Washington who loses his only friends—Hank, a fellow homeless man and his pet dog—on the same day. Dejected, Mason attempts to commit suicide when a soup kitchen worker, Walter Cole, saves him. Cole refers him to businessman Thomas Burns, who kindly offers Mason a job as a hunting guide. Despite his misgivings, the lure of a well paying job causes Mason to accept.

Flying to a remote cabin surrounded by hundreds of acres of woods, Mason meets the rest of the hunting party, all of whom paid $50,000 for the privilege of being there. In addition to Burns and Cole, the party includes Doc Hawkins, the founder of the hunt and a psychopathic psychiatrist who specializes in psychological assessments, Texas "oil man" John Griffin, and wealthy executive Derek Wolfe Sr. and his son Derek Wolfe Jr., the latter of whom is at first unaware of the true purposes of the hunt. On the first night, all the men are eating a nice dinner and engaging in conversation. Mason receives a pack of cigarettes from Hawkins and learns a little about his past. Hawkins relays a brutal story from his childhood when his father forced him to fight and kill his dog as a lesson in being a man.

The following morning, Mason is awakened with a gun in his face by Cole, who explains that the men are not hunting any animals, but rather Mason himself. Mason is given a head start with only the time it takes the others to eat breakfast. Mason quickly flees the area, but comes to a realization and turns back. The hunters finish their meal and set off after him. Wolfe Jr. is horrified at the thought of killing a man, but is pushed into it by his father. The hunters race off into the forest, but by now Mason has returned to the cabin in search of weapons. He finds none, and instead makes the disgusting discovery of the hunters' trophy room behind a locked door: the preserved heads of the victims of previous hunts.

Mason decides to burn the cabin down using chemicals found outside the cabin. The hunters quickly assume Mason's return to the cabin and go back. Wolfe Sr. enters just as Mason lights up the cabin and engages in a fist fight with Hawkins out back, away from the others. Hawkins is knocked back into the cabin as the preserving agent explodes, killing him in the inferno. Wolfe Jr. saves his father, and spots Mason fleeing in the process. The hunt resumes and Mason begins to use his wits to beat the hunters, luring them with falsely-planted lit cigarettes to lead them in the wrong way. Mason manages to lure Griffin away from the others, and takes him hostage.

Over the night, Mason learns why Griffin is taking part in the hunt. A couple of months ago, his daughter was murdered by a homeless man and he's venting his rage, which was enhanced earlier when he asked Mason what happened to his family and Mason sarcastically snarled "I killed them." Mason then reveals that he didn't literally kill his family : they died in an apartment fire that he couldn't rescue them from, and Griffin realizes that Mason's comment earlier means that Mason blames himself for the tragedy even though it wasn't his fault. Griffin is freed by Mason as he takes off and returns to the group having a change of heart, he tells Burns that he will not continue the hunting, but is murdered by Cole to prevent any future legal conflicts. By now, with their numbers dwindling, the remaining hunters seem more intent on killing Mason.  Mason sabotages one of their ATVs, causing it to explode. The explosion rips off most of Cole's lower body, mortally wounding him. Burns then uses his fingers to apply pressure to Cole's jugulars in order to kill him and spare him from the pain. As they pursue Mason, Wolfe Jr. is killed by accident when he falls in a ravine, and Wolfe Sr. vows revenge in a fit of rage.

The second night sees Wolfe Sr. and Mason fighting one on one with Mason the victor and Burns escaping to the city, knowing that Mason will most likely be searching for him. Days later, Burns is back in Seattle, preparing to leave his current identity, hoping to escape both Mason and the legal responsibilities resulting from the disastrous hunt. But Mason has escaped the forest, returned to the city, and tracked him down. A fight ensues where Mason beats up Burns and takes his gun, but instead of shooting the evil man Mason just leaves the gun and walks away. Burns picks up the gun, thinking Mason screwed up and prepares to shoot him. What he doesn't realize is Mason used a tip from his late friend Hank and messed with the barrel on Burns' gun; when Burns tries to kill Mason, the gun backfires and kills Burns instead, and Mason walks off into the night.

Cast
 Ice-T as Jack Mason, a homeless man suffering from depression after the death of his wife and child.
 Rutger Hauer as Thomas Burns, a businessman that leads the hunting team.
 Charles S. Dutton as Walter Cole, Burns' partner who picks the "prey".
 Gary Busey as 'Doc' Hawkins, a CIA psychologist and the founder of the hunting team.
 F. Murray Abraham as Derek Wolfe Sr., a Wall Street executive.
 John C. McGinley as John Griffin, an oil tycoon still grieving over the murder of his daughter.
 William McNamara as Derek Wolfe Jr., the son of Mr. Wolfe Sr. and the only one in the team oblivious to their game.
 Jeff Corey as Hank, another homeless man and Mason's best friend.

Filming locations
The film's city scenes are set in Seattle, Washington. However, in some shots, the skyline of Philadelphia is used. The outdoor scenes are supposed to take place across the Oregon border, in the U.S. Northwest. However, they were filmed in locations of Entiat and Wenatchee, Washington. Lake Wenatchee and Wenatchee National Forest are both featured in the film.

Reception
Surviving the Game received mostly negative reviews. It currently holds a 32% approval rating on Rotten Tomatoes based on 19 reviews, with an average rating of 4.6/10.

Entertainment Weeklys Owen Gleiberman called the film "Cliffhanger with one third the firepower," saying that Dickerson does little to differentiate from other films in the genre. He did give praise to the cinematography and the efforts of the main cast, singling out Ice-T for having on-screen charisma but being a bit unconvincing as an action star, concluding that: "Still, for a few moments there, the movie gives Robert Bly just what he deserves." Marjorie Baumgarten of The Austin Chronicle was critical of the script's characters and overall message as being "out-of-whack and sophomoric" but gave credit to the actors portraying them and the production team for being a vital element in Dickerson's filmmaking, saying: "He has a definite flair for action pictures but the stunning contributions from cinematographer Bojan Bazelli add immeasurably to the movie."

Box office 
Surviving the Game debuted at number 6 at the box office and grossed $7.7 million in the US.

See also
 List of American films of 1994

References

External links
 
 

1994 films
1994 action films
1994 drama films
1990s action drama films
1990s adventure films
1990s American films
1990s English-language films
American action drama films
American adventure films
American chase films
Films about death games
Films about homelessness
Films about hunters
Films directed by Ernest Dickerson
Films scored by Stewart Copeland
Films set in forests
Films set in Seattle